Nadia Gruny (born 23 April 1984) is an American former cricketer. She made her Women's Twenty20 International (WT20I) debut for the United States women's cricket team on 17 May 2019, against Canada, in the 2019 ICC Women's Qualifier Americas tournament.

In August 2019, she was named in United States' squad for the 2019 ICC Women's World Twenty20 Qualifier tournament in Scotland. She played in the United States' opening match of the tournament, on 31 August 2019, against Scotland. She was the leading run-scorer for the United States in the tournament, with 98 runs in five matches.

In February 2021, she was named in the Women's National Training Group by the USA Cricket Women's National Selectors ahead of the 2021 Women's Cricket World Cup Qualifier and the 2021 ICC Women's T20 World Cup Americas Qualifier tournaments. In September 2021, USA Cricket confirmed that Gruny had retired from playing international cricket.

References

External links
 

1984 births
Living people
People from Tobago
Trinidad and Tobago emigrants to the United States
American sportspeople of Trinidad and Tobago descent
American women cricketers
United States women Twenty20 International cricketers
21st-century American women